Guava is a common tropical fruit cultivated in many tropical and subtropical regions. The common guava Psidium guajava (lemon guava, apple guava) is a small tree in the myrtle family (Myrtaceae), native to Mexico, Central America, the Caribbean and northern South America. The name guava is also given to some other species in the genus Psidium such as strawberry guava (Psidium cattleyanum) and to the pineapple guava, Feijoa sellowiana. In 2019, 55 million tonnes of guavas were produced worldwide, led by India  with 45% of the total. Botanically, guavas are berries.

Types 

The most frequently eaten species, and the one often simply referred to as "the guava", is the apple guava (Psidium guayava). The flowers are white, with five petals and numerous stamens. The fruits are many-seeded berries.

Etymology 

The term guava appears to have been in use since the mid-16th century. It has been adapted in many European and Asian languages, having a similar form.

Origin and distribution 
Guavas originated from an area thought to extend from Mexico, Central America or northern South America throughout the Caribbean region. Archaeological sites in Peru yielded evidence of guava cultivation as early as 2500 BCE.

Guava was adopted as a crop in subtropical and tropical Asia, parts of the United States (from Tennessee and North Carolina, southward, as well as the west and Hawaii), tropical Africa, South Asia, Southeast Asia, and Oceania. Guavas were introduced to Florida, US in the 19th century and are grown there as far north as Sarasota, Chipley, Waldo and Fort Pierce. However, they are a primary host of the Caribbean fruit fly and must be protected against infestation in areas of Florida where this pest is present.

Guavas are cultivated in many tropical and subtropical countries. Several species are grown commercially; apple guava and its cultivars are those most commonly traded internationally. Guavas also grow in southwestern Europe, specifically the Costa del Sol on Málaga, (Spain) and Greece where guavas have been commercially grown since the middle of the 20th century and they proliferate as cultivars.

Guavas are of interest to home growers in subtropical areas as one of the few tropical fruits that can grow to fruiting size in pots indoors. When grown from seed, guava trees can bear fruit in two years, and can continue to do so for forty years.

Ecology 

Psidium species are eaten by the caterpillars of some Lepidoptera, mainly moths like the Ello Sphinx (Erinnyis ello), Eupseudosoma aberrans, E. involutum, and Hypercompe icasia. Mites, like Pronematus pruni and Tydeus munsteri, are known to be crop pests of the apple guava (P. guajava) and perhaps other species. The bacterium Erwinia psidii causes rot diseases of the apple guava.

The fruit is cultivated and favored by humans, and many other animals such as birds consume it, readily dispersing the seeds in their droppings. In Hawaii, strawberry guava (P. littorale) has become an aggressive invasive species threatening extinction to more than 100 other plant species. By contrast, several guava species have become rare due to habitat destruction and at least one (Jamaican guava, P. dumetorum), is already extinct.

Guava wood is used for meat smoking in Hawaii, and is used at barbecue competitions across the United States. In Cuba and Mexico, the leaves are used in barbecues.

Fruit 
They have a pronounced and typical fragrance, similar to lemon rind but less sharp. The outer skin may be rough, often with a bitter taste, or soft and sweet. Varying between species, the skin can be any thickness, is usually green before maturity, but may be yellow, maroon, or green when ripe. The pulp inside may be sweet or sour and off-white ("white" guavas) to deep pink ("red" guavas). The seeds in the central pulp vary in number and hardness, depending on species.

Production 
In 2019, world production of guavas was 55 million tonnes, led by India with 45% of the total (table). Other major producers were China and Thailand.

Culinary uses 

In Mexico and other Latin American countries, the popular beverage agua fresca is often made with guava. The entire fruit is a key ingredient in punch, and the juice is often used in culinary sauces (hot or cold), ales, candies, dried snacks, fruit bars, and desserts, or dipped in chamoy. Pulque de guayaba ("guayaba" is Spanish for guava) is a popular alcoholic beverage in these regions.

In many countries, guava is eaten raw, typically cut into quarters or eaten like an apple; it is also eaten with a pinch of salt and pepper, cayenne powder or a mix of spices (masala). In the Philippines, ripe guava is used in cooking sinigang. Guava is a popular snack in Cuba as pastelitos de guayaba; and in Taiwan, sold on many street corners and night markets during hot weather, accompanied by packets of dried plum powder mixed with sugar and salt for dipping. In east Asia, guava is commonly eaten with sweet and sour dried plum powder mixtures. Guava juice is popular in many countries. The fruit is also often included in fruit salads.

Because of its high level of pectin, guavas are extensively used to make candies, preserves, jellies, jams, and marmalades (such as Brazilian goiabada and Colombian and Venezuelan bocadillo), and as a marmalade jam served on toast.

Red guavas can be used as the base of salted products such as sauces, substituting for tomatoes, especially to minimize the acidity. A drink may be made from an infusion of guava fruits and leaves, which in Brazil is called chá-de-goiabeira, i.e., "tea" of guava tree leaves, considered medicinal.

Constituents

Nutrients 

Guavas are rich in dietary fiber and vitamin C, with moderate levels of folic acid (nutrition table). Low in food energy per typical serving, and with few essential nutrients, a single common guava (P. guajava) fruit contains 257% of the Daily Value (DV) for vitamin C (table). Nutrient content varies across guava cultivars. Although the strawberry guava (P. littorale var. cattleianum) has only 39% of the vitamin C in common varieties, its content in a 100 gram serving (90 mg) still provides 100% of the DV.

Phytochemicals 

Guava leaves contain both carotenoids and polyphenols like (+)-gallocatechin and leucocyanidin. As some of these phytochemicals produce the fruit skin and flesh color, guavas that are red-orange tend to have more polyphenol and carotenoid content than yellow-green ones.

Guava seed oil 

Guava seed oil, which may be used for culinary or cosmetics products,  is a source of beta carotene, vitamin A, vitamin C, copper, zinc and selenium,  and is particularly rich in linoleic acid.

The composition of fatty acids in guava seed oil is presented in the following table:

Folk medicine 
Since the 1950s, guavas – particularly the leaves – have been studied for their constituents, potential biological properties and history in folk medicine.

Parasites 

Guavas are one of the most common hosts for fruit flies like A. suspensa, which lay their eggs in overripe or spoiled guavas. The larvae of these flies then consume the fruit until they can proceed into the pupa stage. This parasitism has led to millions in economic losses for nations in Central America.

See also 
 Myrteae, the tribe containing guava and closely related plants with fleshy fruit

References 

Berries
Edible fruits
Mexican cuisine
Cuban cuisine
Belizean cuisine